Ludecke, Lüdecke, Luedecke, Lüddecke or Luddecke is a German surname. Notable people with the surname include:

Alvin Luedecke (1910–1998), United States Air Force general
Kristin Ludecke (born 1977), American beauty pageant contestant
Kurt Ludecke (1890–1960), German Nazi
Old Man Luedecke, Canadian singer-songwriter and musician
Otto-Joachim Lüdecke (1895–1971), German general
Fritz Lüddecke (1920-1944), German Nazi fighter pilot

See also
Luedecke Arena, sports venue in Austin, Texas, United States

German-language surnames
Surnames from given names